Warrior Run High School is a small, rural public high school located in Turbotville, Pennsylvania. It is the sole high school operated by the Warrior Run School District. It serves the residents of the boroughs of Turbotville, McEwensville and Watsontown. It also serves Gregg Township in Union County, Delaware Township and Lewis Township in Northumberland County; as well as Anthony Township and Limestone Township in Montour County. In 2016, Warrior Run High School reported its enrollment was 479 pupils.
Warrior Run High School students may choose to attend Lycoming Career and Technology Center  for training in the building trades, automotive technology, culinary arts, allied health services and child care. The Central Susquehanna Intermediate Unit CSIU16 provides the high school with a wide variety of services like specialized education for disabled students and hearing, speech and visual disability services and professional development for staff and faculty.

Extracurriculars
The Warrior Run School District offers a variety of extracurriculars, including clubs, activities and an extensive sports program. The sports programs are through the Pennsylvania Heartland Athletic Conference and the Pennsylvania Interscholastic Athletic Association. The Pennsylvania Heartland Athletic Conference is a voluntary association of 25 PIAA High Schools within the central Pennsylvania region.

Sports
The district funds:

Boys
Baseball - Varsity and JV  teams AAA
Basketball- AAA
Cross country - Class AA
Football - Varsity and JV  teams AA
Golf - AA
Soccer - AA
Track and field - AA
Wrestling - AA

Girls
Basketball - AAA
Cross country - A
Field hockey - A
Golf - AA
Soccer - A
Softball - Varsity and JV  teams AAA
Track and field - AA

Middle school sports

Boys
Basketball
Football
Soccer
Wrestling 

Girls
Basketball
Field hockey

According to PIAA directory July 2012  Updated per 2017 Directory

References

Education in Northumberland County, Pennsylvania
Education in Union County, Pennsylvania
Education in Montour County, Pennsylvania
Public high schools in Pennsylvania
Susquehanna Valley